Ophthalmolepis lineolata, the southern Maori wrasse, is a species of wrasse endemic to the Indian Ocean coastal waters of Australia. This species is the only known member of its genus.

References

Labridae
Taxa named by Pieter Bleeker
Monotypic ray-finned fish genera